is a Japanese football player. He plays for FC Tokyo.

Career
Kazuna Takase joined J1 League club FC Tokyo in 2017.

References

External links

1999 births
Living people
Association football people from Tokyo
Japanese footballers
J1 League players
FC Tokyo players
Association football goalkeepers
South Florida Bulls men's soccer players